Jeanette Schultze (1931–1972) was a German film actress. She played leading roles in a number of post-war Austrian and West German films such as Martina (1949) and A Night in Venice (1953). Several of her appearances were in operetta films. She was married to the actor Albert Hehn.

Selected filmography
 Martina (1949) 
 The Bridge (1949)
 Anonymous Letters (1949)
 The Orplid Mystery (1950)
 Scandal at the Embassy (1950)
 When Men Cheat (1950)
  The Csardas Princess (1951)
 Queen of the Night (1951)
 Professor Nachtfalter (1951)
 Ideal Woman Sought (1952)
 A Night in Venice (1953)
 Red Roses, Red Lips, Red Wine (1953)
 Island of the Dead (1955)

References

Bibliography 
 Goble, Alan. The Complete Index to Literary Sources in Film. Walter de Gruyter, 1999.

External links 
 
 "Jeanette Schultze-Hehn" (memorial and gravesite information). Salt Lake City, Utah: Find A Grave, retrieved online September 1, 2018.

1931 births
1972 deaths
German film actresses
Actors from Leipzig
20th-century German actresses